Bolejny  is a village in the administrative district of Gmina Nidzica, within Nidzica County, Warmian-Masurian Voivodeship, in northern Poland. Until 1945 the village belonged to Germany and was named "Bolleinen".

References

Bolejny